Welsh Singers Competition (previously known as the Welsh Singers Showcase), is a biennial singing competition that is held in Cardiff, Wales. The winner of the competition represents Wales in the BBC Cardiff Singer of the World in the following year. The competition is open to Welsh classical singers aged between 17 and 31. The final of the competition in 2022 will be held at The Dora Stoutzker Hall, Royal Welsh College of Music & Drama, Cardiff. Previously it has been held at St David's Hall in Cardiff.

History
The competition was established in 1964 by the Welsh Arts Council as the Young Welsh Singers’ Competition by Roy Bohana, Music Director of the Welsh Arts Council, it was initially held every three years. In 1994 a major change took place when it was decided that the winner would automatically represent Wales in BBC Cardiff Singer of the World; this necessitated that the competition became biennial. Organisation was passed to Live Music Now, the charity founded by Yehudi Menuhin, which supports young musicians at the start of their careers, by offering them performing opportunities in care homes, hospitals, community settings, schools, libraries and hospices. 

In 2015 the competition became independent; by 2018 the name of the competition was changed from the Welsh Singers Competition to the Welsh Singers Showcase and in 2022 it reverted back to its original name of Welsh Singers Competition. In the same year the Welsh Singers Showcase became a registered charity.

Competitions

See also
 BBC Cardiff Singer of the World competition

References

External links
 Official website

British biennial events
Opera competitions
Events in Cardiff
Music in Cardiff
1964 establishments in Wales